After the 18th and final round of the 1988 B.A.R.C./B.R.D.C. Lucas Formula Three British Championship, the mobile telephone company Cellnet, who were already sponsoring the Intersport Racing team, organised an invitation non championship, end of season race. This race was held at Brands Hatch, on 9 October.  Although Avon Tyres still supplied the tyres, Cellnet decided to increase interest by introducing a compulsory wheel change mid-race. They requested that the changes should be visible to spectators, so Avon came up with the idea of painting the whole side of the tyres.

Report

Entry
A total of 39 F3 cars were entered for this event.  Come race weekend eights cars failed to arrive in Kent for qualifying.

Qualifying
John Alcorn took pole position for Pacific Racing Team in their Toyota-engined Reynard 883, averaging a speed of 95.862 mph.

Race
The race was held over 45 wet laps of the Brands Hatch Indy circuit. With a full grid of 28 cars, the start was quite a fraught affair as various drivers, with nothing to lose, took risks not usually attempted during a championship race. This ended in tears for some. Damon Hill didn’t even finish the first lap and Kenny Bräck and Jonathan Bancroft went out in the next lap. During the race, the wheel changing was full of drama as the teams finally put into practice what they had been learning, some successfully, others not! Paul Warwick in his Eddie Jordan Racing Reynard was also victim retiring after an overheated engine. 
Gary Brabham took the winner spoils for the Bowman Racing team, driving their Ralt-Volkswagen RT32. The Aussie won in a time of 37:10.92mins., averaging a speed of 87.436 mph. Second place went to Jason Elliott and Sweden’s Rickard Rydell finishing third. 
The ‘fastest wheel change’ prize of £1,000 in loose £1 coins in a sack, was won by Middlebridge Racing which was a bit of a bonus a their driver, Phil Andrews, had driven a good race to finish 5th.

Classification

Race

Class winners in bold

 Fastest lap: Eddie Irvine, 44.34secs. (95.545 mph)

References

British Formula Three Championship
Cellnet Superprix